The Fred Harlow House, located in Troutdale, Oregon, is listed on the National Register of Historic Places. The building sits within the  Harlow House Park.

See also
 National Register of Historic Places listings in Multnomah County, Oregon

References

External links

 

Houses in Multnomah County, Oregon
Houses on the National Register of Historic Places in Oregon
National Register of Historic Places in Multnomah County, Oregon
Troutdale, Oregon